The 2007 NORCECA Beach Volleyball Circuit is a North American beach volleyball tour.
The tour consists of seven tournaments with both genders.

Tournaments
 Boca Chica Tournament, Dominican Republic – 6–8 April 2007
 Guatemala City Tournament, Guatemala – 20–22 April 2007
 Carolina, Puerto Rico Tournament – 18–20 May 2007
 Port of Spain Tournament, Trinidad and Tobago – 25–27 May 2007 (Women's Only)

Tournament results

Women

Men

Medal table by country
Medal table as of June 1, 2007.

References

 
North American
2007